Marco Antonio Mejía Caballero (born 26 March 1975) is a Honduran footballer who currently plays for Juticalpa in the Honduran Second Division.

Club career
Maco played for several clubs in the Honduran National League over a career spanning 17-years, his last Liga Nacional club being Deportes Savio. At 37 years of age, Mejía joined Juticalpa for the 2013 Clausura.

International career
Mejía made his debut for Honduras in a May 2000 friendly match against Canada and has earned a total of 6 caps, scoring no goals. He has represented his country in 2 FIFA World Cup qualification matches and played at the 2001 UNCAF Nations Cups

His final international was a May 2001 UNCAF Nations Cup match against El Salvador.

References

External links

1975 births
Living people
People from San Pedro Sula
Association football defenders
Honduran footballers
Honduras international footballers
Platense F.C. players
Real C.D. España players
C.D.S. Vida players
Hispano players
Deportes Savio players
Liga Nacional de Fútbol Profesional de Honduras players
2001 UNCAF Nations Cup players